Apator Toruń, historically KS Toruń, known also in the past as Unibax Toruń due to ownership changes, is a Polish motorcycle speedway team from Toruń in Poland. The team currently competes in the Ekstraliga (the highest division) and have won the Team Speedway Polish Championship four times.

Team information 
 Name: Klub Sportowy KS Toruń SA
 Address: 87-100 Toruń, ul. Pera Jonssona 7
 Home track: MotoArena im. Mariana Rose; ul. Pera Jonssona 7, Toruń
 Home arena capacity: 15500

History

1955 to 1961 
Speedway motorcycles roared in Toruń as early as 1930, where they raced in classes according to engine size. The sport, called "Dirt-track" at the time, carried on in Toruń up until World War II. Immediately after the war, racing resumed and the Toruń's Motorcycle Club (Toruński Klub Motocyklowy) was formed. The current speedway track in Toruń saw its first race in 1950 when races were move from Bema street to the then army stadium at Ulica Broniewskiego. At the time, Zbigniew Raniszewski was Toruń's best rider. He died during a match in Vienna in the mid-1950s.

From 1957 the speedway club operated under the Friends of Soldiers League (Liga Przyjaciół Żołnierza), and one year later Toruń  officially raced under the league and won with Unia Leszno. During the 1959 Polish speedway season, the riders from Copernicus's birthplace appeared in the third league placing second to last (7th). In 1960, they continued to race as LPŻ Toruńbut placed last and in 1961 a team called MKŻ Toruń finished 7th.

1962 to 1975 
In 1962, a speedway club named Stal KS Toruń was founded and competed in the second league. In 1966, their leading rider Marian Rose won the silver medal at the Polish Individual Speedway Championship. Rose helped riders like Jan Ząbik, Janusz Plewiński, Roman Kościecha and Bogdan Szuluk, but sadly he died after a crash during a match in Rzeszów in 1970. Meanwhile the club continued to compete in the second division for 14 years

1976 to 1985
In 1976 the first league was rebuilt into ten teams and Toruń receive a promotion. A young talented rider Kazimierz Araszewicz died in a crash during the 1976 season. The team began to race as Apator Toruń after the Apator Sports Club and continued to compete in the highest division. They won a silver medal in the pairs during 1981 and the team gained their first honours in 1983, after taking the team championship bronze medal. Wojciech Żabiałowicz won the 1985 Golden Helmet.

1986 to 1999
In 1986, Toruń won their first Polish champion title, overtaking rivals Polonia Bydgoszcz at the end of the season. The team consisted of riders such as Zabiałowicz, Eugeniusz Miastkowski, Grzegorz Śniegowski and Stanisław Miedziński. Zabiałowicz and Śniegowski also won the pairs championship. The team grew to become one of the best speedway teams in Poland, winning the 1990 gold medal with a team that included Żabiałowicz, Jacek Krzyżaniak, Mirosław Kowalik and Robert Sawina. They then won four consecutive bronze medals followed by two silver medals from 1991 to 1996. The 1990 world champion Per Jonsson was instrumental in much of the success.

2000 to present 

Toruń were inaugural members of the Ekstraliga in 2000 and in 2001 signed Tony Rickardsson, which instantly saw success as Toruń won their third gold medal. The Polish championship title in 2001 lasted to the final heat of the final match against Atlas Wrocław, with Toruń's riders winning the heat 5-1. They secured two silver medals in 2003 and 2007 but in between the team was bought by a trader Roman Karkosik and the name was changed to Unibax Toruń.

A fourth gold medal was won during the 2008 Polish speedway season and Wiesław Jaguś and Robert Kościecha also won the pairs. From 2009 to 2016 the club won three more silver medals and two more bronze medals but in 2019, the club suffered its first relegation after 44 successive years in the top league. The team won the 2020 1.Liga to gain a quick promotion back to the Ekstraliga. 

Teams
2023 team
 / Emil Sayfutdinov
  Patryk Dudek
  Robert Lambert
  Paweł Przedpełski (captain)  Wiktor Lampart
  Krzysztof Lewandowski
  Mateusz Affelt
  Zach Cook
  Bastian Pedersen

Previous teams

2022 team

  Patryk Dudek
  Robert Lambert
  Paweł Przedpełski (captain)''
  Jack Holder
  Petr Chlupáč
  Casper Henriksson
  Kyle Bickley
  Zach Cook
  Oskar Rumiński
  Denis Zieliński
  Krzysztof Lewandowski
  Kacper Czajkowski
  Mateusz Affelt
  Karol Żupiński

Notable riders

 Honours 
 Golden Medal: 1986, 1990, 2001, 2008 
 Silver Medal: 1995, 1996, 2003, 2007, 2009, 2013, 2016
 Bronze Medal''': 1983, 1991, 1992, 1993, 1994, 2010, 2012

References

Toruń
Sport in Toruń